Richfield is a town in Adams County in the U.S. state of Wisconsin. The population was 158 at the 2010 census. The ghost town of Pilot Knob was located in the town.

Geography

Richfield is located at  (44.029410, −89.660180).

Demographics
As of the census of 2000, there were 144 people, 62 households, and 44 families residing in the town. The population density was 4.1 people per square mile (1.6/km2). There were 103 housing units at an average density of 2.9 per square mile (1.1/km2). The racial makeup of the town was 99.31% White, and 0.69% from two or more races.

There were 62 households, out of which 16.1% had children under the age of 18 living with them, 64.5% were married couples living together, 3.2% had a female householder with no husband present, and 29.0% were non-families. 21.0% of all households were made up of individuals, and 12.9% had someone living alone who was 65 years of age or older. The average household size was 2.32 and the average family size was 2.64.

In the town, the population was spread out, with 18.8% under the age of 18, 5.6% from 18 to 24, 20.1% from 25 to 44, 34.0% from 45 to 64, and 21.5% who were 65 years of age or older. The median age was 48 years. For every 100 females, there were 132.3 males. For every 100 females age 18 and over, there were 120.8 males.

The median income for a household in the town was $34,792, and the median income for a family was $34,792. Males had a median income of $26,250 versus $19,375 for females. The per capita income for the town was $23,333. There were 14.0% of families and 17.1% of the population living below the poverty line, including 35.0% of under eighteens and 14.3% of those over 64.

References

Towns in Adams County, Wisconsin
Towns in Wisconsin